Lagrange is an unincorporated community in Culpeper County, Virginia, United States.

Notes

Unincorporated communities in Culpeper County, Virginia
Unincorporated communities in Virginia